Wollaston School is a co-educational secondary school and sixth form located in Wollaston in the English county of Northamptonshire.

The Wollaston School catchment area includes the villages of Bozeat, Brafield-on-the-Green, Castle Ashby, Chadstone, Cogenhoe, Denton, Easton Maudit, Great Houghton, Grendon, Irchester, Little Houghton, Strixton, Whiston, Wollaston and Yardley Hastings. However pupils from Wellingborough and surrounding villages are admitted when places are available.

Previously a community school administered by Northamptonshire County Council, in April 2019 Wollaston School converted to academy status and is now sponsored by the Nene Valley Partnership.

Wollaston School offers GCSEs, BTECs and other vocational courses as programmes of study for pupils, while sixth form students can choose to study from range of A Levels and further BTECs.

References

External links
Wollaston School official website

Secondary schools in North Northamptonshire
Academies in North Northamptonshire